Doug Peterson (born May 11, 1953) is an American cross-country skier. He competed at the 1976 Winter Olympics and the 1980 Winter Olympics.

References

1953 births
Living people
American male cross-country skiers
Olympic cross-country skiers of the United States
Cross-country skiers at the 1976 Winter Olympics
Cross-country skiers at the 1980 Winter Olympics
Skiers from Minneapolis
20th-century American people